Kumasaka (The Robber) is a Noh play from the 15th century attributed by Arthur Waley to Zenchiku Ujinobu, about the notable Heian period bandit Kumasaka no Chohan.

The play takes the form of Mugen Noh - supernatural, or dream-time Noh.

Legendary background
The samurai hero, Minamoto no Yoshitsune - known in his early life as Ushiwaka or Young Bull - had a series of David and Goliath encounters attributed to him in his youth, one of which concerned repelling a bandit attack led by the robber Kumasaka (a figure sometimes identified as the slayer of Young Bull's mother).

Plot
A travelling monk is offered shelter by another, on condition that he prays for an anonymous soul buried by a pine-tree. The traveller is surprised to see a large pike hanging on the cottage wall; and the other uncovers his past as a robber, before vanishing, thereby revealing to the priest that "It was under the shadow of a pine-tree that he had rested". 

Thereafter, the robber reappears as the ghost of Kumasaka, and tells the story of his last fight, and of his death at the hands of Ushiwaka, "The wonderful boy...be he ogre or hobgoblin".

Literary associations
The play has been seen as a retrospective telling of the last part of the genzai-mono (real-time) play,Eboshi-ori.

Basho referenced the pine tree associated with Kumasaka in a renga: "a pine in memory/of a bandit/broken by the wind.

See also
Benkei on the Bridge
El Cid

References

External links 
 Kumasaka

Noh
Noh plays